(GT) is a series of racing simulation video games developed by Polyphony Digital. Developed for PlayStation systems, Gran Turismo games are intended to emulate the appearance and performance of a large selection of vehicles, most of which are licensed reproductions of real-world automobiles. Since the franchise's debut in 1997, over 90 million units have been sold worldwide, making it the highest selling video game franchise under the PlayStation brand.

Overview

The Gran Turismo series is developed by Polyphony Digital and produced by Kazunori Yamauchi. Gran Turismo can trace back its origins to 1992, when Kazunori Yamauchi set out with a group of seven to develop the original Gran Turismo, which took five years to complete.

The appeal of the Gran Turismo series is due significantly to its graphics, a large number of licensed vehicles, attention to vehicle detail, accurate driving physics emulation, and the ability to tune performance, hence the subtitle "The Real Driving Simulator", incorporated to the franchise's iconography since Gran Turismo 4. Handling of the vehicles is modeled on real-life driving impressions, tuning is based on principles of physics, and the sound of the vehicle's engine is based on recordings of the actual vehicles. The game has been a flagship for the PlayStation console's graphics capabilities, and is often used to demonstrate the system's potential.

Although Gran Turismo has an arcade mode, most gameplay derives from its simulation mode. Players start with a certain number of credits, usually 10,000, which are used to purchase vehicles from several manufacturer-specific shops, or (more likely at the beginning) from used car dealers, and then tune their car at the appropriate parts store for best performance. Certain events are open only to particular types of vehicles. In order to enter and progress through more difficult races, a license-testing system has been implemented, which guides players through skill development. Players may apply prize money won in events to upgrade their existing car or buy a new one, collecting a garage of vehicles.

Since Gran Turismo 5 Prologue launched on the PS3, an online aspect of the gameplay has started to evolve. GT5 Prologue has enabled users to race online with up to 16 players on track at once. Gran Turismo 4 for the PS2 was actually the first online-enabled Gran Turismo game but the online aspect of the game did not make it past beta stage.

According to Yamauchi, the cars in the first two games were made from 300 polygons, while those in Gran Turismo 3 and 4 were made up of 4,000 polygons, and the "premium cars" in Gran Turismo 5 were made up of 500,000 ("standard cars" are slightly more detailed versions of those in Gran Turismo 4).

With the release of Gran Turismo Sport, it became the first game mainly focusing on online-only racing, whereas offline is limited. However, Gran Turismo Sport provided post-release content at no charge, including cars and tracks, along with offline events, as well as bug fixes.

The next game in development, Gran Turismo 7, was revealed at the 2020 PS5 Future of Gaming event on June 11, 2020. The title was developed for PlayStation 4 and PlayStation 5 with a release date of March 4, 2022. Gran Turismo 7 is the first title of the franchise to release on multiple consoles.

Games

Game history
The Gran Turismo series is represented by eight primary releases, two for the PlayStation, two for the PlayStation 2, two for the PlayStation 3, two for the PlayStation 4, and one for the PlayStation 5. The series is also represented by a title for the PlayStation Portable and many other secondary releases on the PS2 and PS3.

Releases

Primary releases

Secondary releases

Other releases

Gran Turismo related products

Official simulator kits
Polyphony Digital has collaborated with peripherals manufacturer Logitech and auto parts maker Sparco to design official driving simulator kits for the Gran Turismo franchise. The most recent product designation is Driving Force GT. Two other racing wheels are compatible with Gran Turismo.

Official model car kits
In 2009, radio-control model car company HPI Racing released an official RC car tie-in: the HPI E10 RTR Ford GT LM Race Car Spec II designed by Gran Turismo (200mm), a pre-built officially licensed radio-control car kit built to look exactly like the cover car for Gran Turismo 4 . Plans for future releases include releasing more kits to replicate other Gran Turismo cover cars.

Gran Turismo cafe
In 2009, a cafe opened at the Twin Ring Motegi racetrack.

Street namings
In acknowledgment of the Mount Panorama Circuit's inclusion in Gran Turismo 6, the City of Bathurst in Australia unveiled a new street called Gran Turismo Drive in December 2013. Mayor of Bathurst, Gary Rush said  "Driving a lap of our world famous motor racing circuit is a life changing experience for those who have the chance, and the Bathurst Regional Council is very excited about opening up the Mount Panorama experience through the launch of Gran Turismo 6."

Also in 2013, series creator Kazunori Yamauchi had a street named in honor of him in the city of Ronda, Spain. Named Paseo de Kazunori Yamauchi, the street snakes around the Parador de Ronda. According to Ronda's city mayor Maria de la Paz Fernandez Lobato, "There is no doubt that his work has a huge cultural resonance with people today. He has driven the racing game genre to new levels of realism and his creations are as much art as technology. Ronda’s association with Gran Turismo is also a reflection that our ancient city is a modern, vibrant place to live and very much part of the 21st century.”

Sponsorship
The series has been involved in sponsoring various real-life sporting events and teams, including the Pikes Peak International Hill Climb as of November 2014, D1GP since the 2008 season, the 2004 Race of Champions, the first chicane on the Mulsanne Straight at Circuit de la Sarthe until 2012, and racing teams/drivers such as Prost Grand Prix, Pescarolo Sport, Audi/Oreca, Peugeot, Abt Sportsline, Signatech-Nissan, Audi A4 DTM, Vita4One-BMW Z4, Aston Martin Rapide S, Igor Fraga, Lewis Hamilton, and Sébastien Loeb.

Competitions

GT Academy

The GT Academy was a driver discovery/development program initiated through a partnership between Sony Computer Entertainment Europe, Polyphony Digital, and Nissan Europe. The program lasted from 2008 to 2016.

Online qualifiers were held within Gran Turismo, with the top qualifiers being invited to National Finals in each participating country. The top winners of each country were sent to a Race Camp held at Silverstone, UK for the final selection. The winners were to undergo an intensive Driver Development Program designed by Nissan with the intention to train and license them into a professional driver, competing in races worldwide. The four winning drivers were to join the Nismo Global Driver Exchange and go on to race in the following years' Dubai 24 Hour. Winners of the Gran Turismo Academy include Lucas Ordóñez, Jordan Tresson and Jann Mardenborough, who have all gone on to compete in professional real-life racing. Some of these winners, who would normally be seen as "non-professionals", have received praise relating to how they are as skilled as drivers with years of experience. Based on this merit, four GT Academy drivers have been barred entry to the British GT (specifically the 'gentleman driver' section of the competition).

Gran Turismo World Series

The Gran Turismo World Series is a series of Gran Turismo tournaments held around the world since 2018.

Olympic Virtual Series
In 2021, the FIA and the International Olympic Committee collaborated and hosted the Olympic Virtual Series, in which Gran Turismo Sport was used as one of the games used to host the motor sport event. The motor sport virtual series was an online time trial competition, in which entry is open to all players of Gran Turismo Sport's Sport Mode.

In 2023, it was announced that Gran Turismo would be a part of the Olympics Esports Series 2023 as the motor sport event.

Reception

The Gran Turismo video game series has been one of the most popular over its lifetime, appealing to an audience ranging from casual gamers to fans of realistic racing sims.

Because of the success of the Gran Turismo series, Guinness World Records awarded the series 7 world records in the Guinness World Records: Gamer's Edition 2008. These records include "Largest Number of Cars in a Racing Game", "Highest Selling PlayStation Game", "Oldest Car in a Racing Game", and "Largest Instruction Guide for a Racing Game". The success of the series has led to other studios creating simulation racing games similar to the franchise. It started with Sega GT, Sega's answer to the franchise, which was released on the short-lived Dreamcast console and later had a sequel on the original Xbox before the franchise died off after low sales success. Turn 10 would later create the Forza Motorsport series for the Xbox consoles, which later saw releases on Microsoft Windows, which has been often seen as the primary rival of the Gran Turismo series. Other similar titles include Driving Emotion Type-S by Square and Enthusia Professional Racing by Konami.

In the final issue of the Official UK PlayStation Magazine, Gran Turismo 2 was chosen as the 5th best game of all time. Edge said the first game was one of the 10 greatest video games of the last 20 years.

In 2005, Maeda Corporation, in association with Tokyo University of Science, researched the feasibility of making a real-life replica version of the fictional Grand Valley Speedway used in the series.

Gran Turismo 7 was strongly criticized by players for its implementation of microtransations and a “pay-to-play” system. The user score in Metacritic as at 20 March 2022 is 2.2 out of 10, which is Sony's lowest user rating and the lowest score in PlayStation exclusive history on the site to date 

As of November 16, 2022, more than 90 million copies of Gran Turismo titles have been sold.

Films

Documentary
At the Jalopnik Film Festival, Kazunori announced a documentary film covering the past 15 years of the game series up until that point, titled KAZ: Pushing The Virtual Divide. It was released on January 22, 2014 on Hulu.

Adaptation

In 2013, Sony Pictures announced it was developing a Gran Turismo film with Michael De Luca and Dana Brunetti producing it, with a script by Alex Tse. In 2015, Joseph Kosinski was set to direct the film, with a new screenplay by Jon and Erich Hoeber. By 2018, the Kosinski version was no longer moving forward. 

On May 26, 2022, a new iteration of the Gran Turismo film was revealed to be in development, with Neill Blomkamp eyed to direct. On June 14, 2022, it was confirmed that Blomkamp would direct and announced that the film would be released on August 11, 2023, which is intended to be a non-fiction Bildungsroman focusing on a teenage Gran Turismo player who graduated from the GT Academy that lead him to become a professional racer. It was also confirmed that Jason Hall and Zach Baylin would write the screenplay. Asad Qizilbash, Carter Swan, Doug Belgrad and Dana Brunetti will serve as producers. David Harbour is set to star in the film as Jack Salter, who teaches Mardenborough how to drive a real car. Archie Madekwe will play Jann Mardenborough, with Orlando Bloom as Danny Moore. Filming began in November 2022 in Hungary, and wrapped in December. Darren Barnet will play a racer who is ranked at the top at the GT academy and who is not thrilled to see Mardenborough excel. Both Djimon Hounsou and Geri Halliwell-Horner will play Mardenborough's parents and Daniel Puig as his brother, Josha Stradowski as Mardenborough's rival and Thomas Kretschmann as his father.

Notes

References

External links

 
Racing simulators
Sony Interactive Entertainment franchises
Video game franchises introduced in 1997
Video game franchises
Video games adapted into films